Tiab (also Romanized as Tīāb, Teyāb, and Tīyab) is a village in Tiab Rural District, in the Central District of Minab County, Hormozgan Province, Iran. At the 2006 census, its population was 2,330, in 465 families.

References 

Populated places in Minab County